Colloniidae is a family of small sea snails with calcareous opercula, marine gastropod mollusks in the clade Vetigastropoda.

Taxonomy

2005 taxonomy 
Colloniidae was listed as subfamily Colloniinae within the family Turbinidae within Turbinoidea according to the taxonomy of the Gastropoda by Bouchet & Rocroi, 2005.

This taxon consists of four following tribes (according to the taxonomy of the Gastropoda by Bouchet & Rocroi, 2005):
 Colloniinae Cossmann, 1917
 tribe Colloniini Cossmann, 1917 - synonym: Bothropomatinae Thiele, 1924 (inv.); Homalopomatinae Keen, 1960; Petropomatinae Cox, 1960
 tribe † Adeorbisinini Monari, Conti & szabo, 1995
 tribe † Crossostomatini Cox, 1960
 tribe † Helicocryptini Cox, 1960

2008 taxonomy 
Colloniidae was elevated to family level and (together with Phasianellidae) belongs to superfamily Phasianelloidea according to Williams et al. (2008). McLean (2012) added two more subfamilies Liotipomatinae and  Moelleriinae.

2017 taxonomy
In 2017 Colloniidae was classified in the order Trochida.

It contains the following subfamilies:
 † Crossostomatinae Cox, 1960 
 Colloniinae
 † Lewisiellinae Gründel, 2008 
 Liotipomatinae
 Moelleriinae
 Petropomatinae

Genera 
Genera in the family Colloniidae include:

 Subfamily Colloniinae Cossmann, 1917
 Anadema H. & A. Adams, 1854
 Argalista Iredale, 1915
 Bothropoma Thiele, 1924
 Cantrainea Jeffreys, 1883
 Collonia Gray, 1850
 Collonista Iredale, 1918
 Emiliotia Faber, 2006
 Homalopoma Carpenter, 1864
 Leptocollonia Powell, 1951
 Leptothyra Pease, 1869
Subfamily Liotipomatinae McLean, 2012
 Depressipoma McLean, 2012
 Liotipoma McLean & Kiel, 2007
  Paraliotipoma McLean, 2012
 Rhombipoma McLean, 2012
 Subfamily Moelleriinae Hickman & McLean, 1990
 Moelleria Jeffreys, 1865
 Spiromoelleria Baxter & McLean, 1984
 † Subfamily Petropomatinae Cox, 1960

Genera brought into synonymy 
 Neocollonia Kuroda & Habe, 1954: synonym of Bothropoma Thiele, 1924
 Thermocollonia Okutani & Fujikura, 1990: synonym of Cantrainea Jeffreys, 1883

References 

 Spencer, H.; Marshall. B. (2009). All Mollusca except Opisthobranchia. In: Gordon, D. (Ed.) (2009). New Zealand Inventory of Biodiversity. Volume One: Kingdom Animalia. 584 pp
 McLean J.H. & Kiel S. 2007. Cretaceous and living Colloniidae of the redefined subfamily Petropomatinae, with two new genera and one new species, with notes on opercular evolution in turbinoideans, and the fossil record of Liotiidae (Vetigastropoda: Turbinoidea). Paläontologische Zeitschrift 81(3): 254-266

 
Gastropod families